Sericomyia flagrans is a North American species of flower fly.

References

Diptera of North America
Eristalinae
Insects described in 1875
Taxa named by Carl Robert Osten-Sacken
Hoverflies of North America